Earache Records is a British independent record label, music publisher and management company founded by Digby Pearson in 1985, based in Nottingham, England, with offices in London and New York. The label helped to pioneer extreme metal by releasing early grindcore and death metal records between the late 1980s and mid-1990s. Its roster has since diversified into more mainstream guitar music, working with bands such as Rival Sons, the Temperance Movement, Blackberry Smoke, Scarlet Rebels and the White Buffalo. The company also hosted the 'Earache Express' stage at Glastonbury Festival in 2017 and 'The Earache Factory' at Boomtown 2018. The label's logo is a homage to Thrasher magazine, as Pearson was a skateboard culture enthusiast.

History
Earache was founded in 1985 by Digby Pearson who prior to launching the label proper had compiled 'Anglican Scrape Attic', a proto-compilation of early hardcore punk and crossover thrash acts which included Hirax, Lipcream and Concrete Sox. Accordingly, the first official Earache release on vinyl in 1987 with catalogue number MOSH 1, was The Accüsed's The Return of Martha Splatterhead. This was followed by a split LP by the crust/crossover band Concrete Sox and the proto-grind band Heresy. The label's first major release of note was MOSH 3, Napalm Death's Scum. Famously, John Peel was a champion of the band and supported them on BBC Radio 1. The record went on to reach number 7 in the UK indie chart. Following this, Earache released music by many bands from the emerging grindcore and death metal scenes, such as Morbid Angel, Carcass, Entombed, Bolt Thrower and Terrorizer.

Although intrinsically linked with death metal, the label's catalogue is varied and also includes Welsh ragga-metal act Dub War, Birmingham's industrial metal pioneers Godflesh, Nottingham's Pitchshifter, hardcore techno outfit Ultraviolence, Mick Harris's industrial/experimental group Scorn, John Zorn-led experimental group Naked City and doom and sludge metal bands Sleep and Acid Bath.

In the early 1990s Columbia Records, seeking to break into metal, signed a deal with Earache. Columbia would license rights and market and distribute them in The Americas, with rights reverting to Earache upon completion of the deal term. It is widely accepted that Columbia failed to deliver the expected sales that they themselves had projected and thus they sought to prematurely terminate the agreement. Barney Greenway of Napalm Death objected to the deal with Columbia (a subsidiary of Sony Music) on the basis that it was "selling out", although Napalm Death have since released music also distributed by Columbia parent Sony Music Entertainment. The rights to all Columbia-licensed titles have since reverted to Earache, who thereafter have been wholly independent, working with distributors as opposed to licensees.

The label has a number of subsidiary labels, including Wicked World Records, Elitist Records, Sub Bass Records and the short-lived Necrosis Records.

Modern era
As with many labels, Earache has transitioned over time from its initial "extreme" output and now focuses primarily on modern, accomplished guitar projects. Rival Sons were the most notable of the modern crop of artists, before signing with Atlantic Records in 2018. Newer signings include Australia's Massive, Nottingham's Haggard Cat and Lancaster's Massive Wagons.
More recent grindcore and death metal signings include Wormrot and Deicide.

Earache also signed the first independent label direct deal with iTunes shortly after the service launched.

Earache currently holds two Guinness World Records. The first is that of the World's Shortest Song, currently held by Napalm Death with "You Suffer" at 1.316 seconds long. The second record is the world's shortest full music video, a record held by Brutal Truth with their track "Collateral Damage".

In 2015 Digby Pearson received the Association of Independent Music Pioneer award.

In 2018 tech sitcom Silicon Valley featured "You Suffer" repeatedly in one episode. In response the label created a Twitter bot (@NapalmDeathBot) which sends an hourly tweet with the price of bitcoin. They also inserted "You suffer" into the blockchain, a first for a label.

In August 2018 Earache signed trap/rap artist ALIREZA301. Alireza is a metal influenced rapper from Maryland who performs a style of trap/rap which in parts heavily incorporates guitars.

Earache's newer rock signings have achieved Top 15 positions in the UK charts, including: a #6 album with The Temperance Movement's A Deeper Cut (2018), a #8 album with Blackberry Smoke's Find a Light (2018), a #9 album with Massive Wagons' House of Noise (2020), a #13 album with Rival Sons' Hollow Bones (2016) and a #14 album with Those Damn Crows' Point Of No Return (2020).

To begin the new decade, Earache Records announced a compilation vinyl titled "The New wave of Rock N Roll" featuring a host of new acts.

Earache Live 
In 2017 Earache were invited to host the first ever stage for heavy music at Glastonbury Festival. 'The Earache Express' was a recycled London underground tube carriage located in the 'Shangri La' area of the site. The stage featured performances from Napalm Death, The Dead Kennedys, Ho99o9, Hacktivist, Glen Matlock of The Sex Pistols, Steve Ignorant of Crass and Wormrot amongst others.

Having been well received by Glastonbury Festival, Boomtown (who are affiliated to Glastonbury) invited Earache to curate a stage at their 2018 event which took place in Winchester during August 2018. The stage (named The Earache Factory) was designed around the concept of a disused factory within a run-down part of a futuristic town. It featured artists such as Soulfly, Dead Kennedys and Enter Shikari not to mention a headline set by British upstarts Idles.

In 2019 Earache will be hosting an evening at Camp Bestival in Dorset bringing along Napalm Death, Lawnmower Deth, Diamond Head, Phil Campbell & The Bastard Sons and Nosebleed.

Criticism
Over the years, the relationship between the label and some of its former artists have become fraught, and Pearson has made a number of disparaging blog posts about, among others, JS Clayden from Pitchshifter and Barney Greenway of Napalm Death. Greenway responded that Pearson "expects everybody to be subservient", while Clayden called Pearson "petty and vindictive" and criticized the label for not allowing fans to stream or purchase Pitchshifter's albums that were released on Earache. In the documentary Slave to the Grind, Scott Carlson from Repulsion accused Earache of not paying the band, adding "I'm sure they sold way more records than they told us they did." Former Iron Monkey drummer Justin Greaves accused Earache of refusing to support the band financially in an emergency when during a European tour, singer Johnny Morrow fell sick and needed to return to the UK, which the band couldn't afford to cover.

Notable artists (past and present)

 Adema (2005–2006)
 Akercocke
 Anaal Nathrakh
 Anata
 Annihilator  (for Europe)
 Arsis
 At the Gates
 Anal Cunt (1994-1999)
 And Hell Followed With
 Beecher
 The Berzerker
 Biomechanical
 Biters
 Blackberry Smoke (European Deal)
 Black Star Riders
 Blood Red Throne
 Bolt Thrower (1989–1997)
 Bonded By Blood
 The Boy Will Drown
 The Browning
 Bring Me the Horizon
 Brutal Truth
 Buckcherry
 Cadaver
 Candiria 
 Carcass (1987–1996)
 Carnage
 Carnival in Coal
 Capharnaum
 Cathedral
 Cauldron
 Cerebral Bore
 The Chasm
 Circle of Dead Children
 Clutch
 Coalesce
 Concrete Sox
 Confessor
  Crotchduster
 Cult of Luna (2003–2009)
 Deadbird
 Decapitated
 December Wolves
 Deicide (2002–2008)
 Delta 9
 Diamond Plate
 DJ Hyper
 Dub War
 Electric Callboy 
 Enforcer
 Entombed (1989–1996)
 Ephel Duath
 Evile
 Ewigkeit
 Exmortem
 Extreme Noise Terror
 Figure Of Merit
 Forest Stream
 Frantic Bleep
 Fudge Tunnel
 Gama Bomb
 Godflesh (1989–2000)
 Goodbye June
 Green Druid
 Hate Eternal
 Haggard Cat
 The Haunted
 Hellbastard
 Heresy
 Hour Of 13
 Hyatari
 Ignominious Incarceration
 Insision
 Iron Monkey
 Janus Stark
 Johnny Violent
 Kagoule
 Lawnmower Deth
 Linea 77
 Love and Death
 Massacre
 Massive
 Massive Wagons
 Misery Loves Co.
 Misfits (band)
 Morbid Angel (1988–2004)
 Mortiis
 Municipal Waste
 Naked City
 Napalm Death (1986–1999)
 Neuraxis
 Nocturnus (1989–1993)
 Oceano (2008–2016)
 OLD (band)
 Ol Drake
 Order of Ennead
 Painkiller
 Pitchshifter (1992–1996)
 Rabies Caste
 Rival Sons (2009-2018)
 Sabazius
 Savage Messiah
 Scarlet Rebels
 Severe Torture
 Scorn
 Society 1
 Sore Throat
 SSS
 Skindred
 Sleep
 Tallah
 Terrorizer
 The Dust Coda
 The More I See
 The Glorious Sons (Europe and Japan) 
 The Soulless
 The Temperance Movement
 Those Damn Crows
 Travis Meadows
 Urkraft
 Vader
 Vektor
 Violator
 Wakrat
 Woods of Ypres
 The White Buffalo (European Deal)
 White Wizzard
 With Passion
 Wormrot
 Danny Worsnop
 Zatokrev

See also 
 Category:Earache Records albums
 List of record labels

References

External links
 
 Chronicles of Chaos interview with Digby Pearson

Record labels established in 1985
1985 establishments in England
English record labels
Companies based in Nottingham
British independent record labels
Black metal record labels
Death metal record labels
Doom metal record labels
Thrash metal record labels
Grindcore record labels
Heavy metal record labels
Hardcore record labels
Rock record labels
Experimental music record labels
Industrial record labels